McCall is a resort town on the western edge of Valley County, Idaho, United States. Named after its founder, Tom McCall, it is situated on the southern shore of Payette Lake, near the center of the Payette National Forest. The population was 2,991 as of the 2010 census, up from 2,084 in 2000.

Originally a logging community whose last sawmill closed in 1977, McCall is now an all-season tourist destination for outdoor recreation. The resort town is known for its Winter Carnival, extended winters, and one of the highest average snowfalls in the state.

Geography

Transportation
It heads north from Eagle in Ada County to Horseshoe Bend in Boise County, and climbs the whitewater of the Payette River to Cascade and McCall. The route turns west at Payette Lake in McCall and ends at New Meadows in Adams County, at the junction with US-95.
 - Payette River Scenic Byway

West of Highway 55, it is home to a U.S. Forest Service Smokejumper Base.

History
Native Americans were the first inhabitants of the McCall area. Three tribes, the Tukudika (a sub-band of the Shoshone known as the "Sheepeaters"), the Shoshone, and the Nez Perce inhabited the land primarily in the summer and migrated during the harsh winter months.

In the early 19th century, mountain men including the nomadic French Canadian fur trapper François Payette, Jim Bridger, Peter Skene Ogden, and Jedediah Smith passed through the area.

During the 1860s, miners temporarily named the settlement "Lake City", but only alluvial gold was discovered, so the temporary establishment was abandoned as most mining activity moved north to the town of Warren.

The settlement of McCall was established by Thomas and Louisa McCall in 1889. Tom, his wife, four sons and a daughter lived in the cabin located on the shore of the lake, near present-day Hotel McCall. He established a school, hotel, saloon, and post office, and named himself postmaster. McCall purchased a sawmill from the Warren Dredging company and later sold it to the Hoff & Brown Lumber Company, which would become a major employer until its closure in 1977.

During this time Anneas "Jews Harp Jack" Wyatte provided the first recreational sailboat rides around the lake for tourists and advertised in Boise's Idaho Statesman a "30-foot sailing yacht for the use of parties who might visit the lake". The Statesman referred to McCall as a "pleasure resort."

Tourism continued in the early 20th century. In June 1902, the Boydstun Hotel in nearby Lardo opened as a "place to stay and camp on Payette Lake". In 1906, Charlie Nelson opened a tented camping area known as Sylvan Beach Resort along the west side of Payette Lake. In 1907, Lardo Inn opened for business. The arrival of the Oregon Short Line Railroad (a subsidiary of the Union Pacific Railroad) in 1914 secured McCall as a viable community and tourist destination. The Town of McCall was officially incorporated on 19 July 1911.

The town's annual winter carnival started in 1923–24. Reports vary between hundreds to thousands of tourists visiting the festivities.

The beauty of McCall and Payette Lake drew attention from Hollywood in 1938 when it was selected as the filming location for the Academy Award-nominated Northwest Passage, starring Spencer Tracy, Robert Young, and Walter Brennan. The film, released in 1940, was set during the French and Indian War of 1755–63 in eastern North America, Idaho's forests substituting for the woods of New England and the Upper Midwest.

In 1943, the U.S. Forest Service opened the McCall smokejumper base, one of eight smokejumper training bases in the nation. The site includes a smokejumper training unit, paraloft, dispatch office, and the McCall air tanker base at the airport.

After World War II, a consortium of businessmen and doctors from Lewiston,  to the north, decided that McCall and the lake were an ideal recreation site and thus the town was transformed from lumber to tourism. The iconic Shore Lodge opened on 3 July 1948, at Shellworth Beach on Payette Lake. The lodge became McCall's centerpiece for the next 51 years. Shore Lodge management and shareholders intentionally created a resort-style lodge that was a cozy and intimate place for locals and tourists, contrasting with the glamor and glitz of the other famous Idaho lodge in Sun Valley. It was turned into a private club in 1999, then it re-opened to the public in 2008. One of Shore Lodge's first summer employees was University of Idaho student John Ascuaga of Notus, who worked as a bellhop learning the business from the bottom up and was to go on to found the Nugget hotel, convention center, and casino in Sparks, Nevada, one of the largest and most successful in the Reno, Nevada area.

In 1965, a  peninsula  outside of McCall became Ponderosa State Park, home to large old-growth trees.

Alpine skiing
Opened in 1937 as a diversion for local forest workers, its  were donated by Carl Brown. The Little Ski Hill was the second ski area in Idaho, after Sun Valley, which opened a year earlier. The aging Nordic ski jump on the lower north slope, overlooking the bend in Highway 55, was removed in the 1990s.

Brundage Mountain, northwest of McCall, opened in November 1961. With the addition of two new lifts in summer 2007, it currently has five chairlifts. The slopes on Brundage Mountain are primarily west-facing and the mountain's average snowfall exceeds . Brundage is a family-owned resort, operated by the DeBoer family, descendants of early McCall pioneers. Until April 2006, it was co-owned by J. R. Simplot.

Tamarack Resort (2004–09) is southwest of McCall, on the west side of Cascade Reservoir. Originally conceived as "Valbois" in the early 1980s, the project was revived as "WestRock" in the late 1990s and ultimately renamed "Tamarack" in 2002. The slopes on Tamarack faced east, overlooking the Cascade Reservoir and Long Valley. The resort went into bank receivership in February 2008 and ceased operations a year later, on the evening of Wednesday, March 4, 2009. The ski area was closed for the 2009–10 season, but re-opened in December 2010 with limited operations.

Demographics

2010 census
As of the 2010 United States Census, there were 2,991 people, 1,348 households, and 769 families in the city. The racial makeup of the city was 93.6% White, 0.1% African American, 0.7% Native American, 0.5% Asian, 3.6% from other races, and 1.4% from two or more races. Hispanic or Latino of any race were 6.9% of the population.

There were 1,348 households, of which 25.1% had children under the age of 18 living with them, 45.3% were married couples living together, 7.2% had a female householder with no husband present, 4.5% had a male householder with no wife present, and 43.0% were non-families. 33.5% of all households were made up of individuals, and 8.2% had someone living alone who was 65 years of age or older. The average household size was 2.19 and the average family size was 2.80.

The median age in the city was 40.7 years. 21% of residents were under the age of 18; 6.9% were between the ages of 18 and 24; 27.5% were from 25 to 44; 31.1% were from 45 to 64; and 13.5% were 65 years of age or older. The gender makeup of the city was 51.7% male and 48.3% female.

2000 census
As of the 2000 United States Census, there were 2,084 people, 902 households, and 549 families in the town. The racial makeup of the town was 96.83% White, 0.05% African American, 0.48% Native American, 0.14% Asian, 1.34% from other races, and 1.15% from two or more races. 2.59% of the population were Hispanic or Latino of any race. 19.2% were of German, 17.3% English, 10.6% Irish and 8.2% American ancestry according to Census 2000. 98.3% spoke English and 1.7% Spanish as their first language.

There were 902 households, out of which 28.8% had children under the age of 18 living with them, 49.2% were married couples living together, 7.9% had a female householder with no husband present, and 39.1% were non-families. 33.3% of all households were made up of individuals, and 11.1% had someone living alone who was 65 years of age or older. The average household size was 2.25 and the average family size was 2.86.

The town population contained 24.3% under the age of 18, 6.0% from 18 to 24, 24.6% from 25 to 44, 30.7% from 45 to 64, and 14.4% who were 65 years of age or older. The median age was 42 years. For every 100 females, there were 104.3 males. For every 100 females age 18 and over, there were 99.9 males.

The median income for a household in the town was $36,250, and the median income for a family was $46,420. Males had a median income of $27,955 versus $26,932 for females. The per capita income for the town was $18,479. 12.2% of the population and 7.0% of families were below the poverty line, including 11.6% of those under the age of 18 and 7.2% of those 65 and older.

Population history
Lardo (now western McCall) had a population of 300 at the 1910 census, its only census entry.

Ancestry/Ethnicity
As of 2017 the largest self-identified ancestry groups/ethnic groups in McCall, Idaho were:

Government
McCall was incorporated as a town on 19 July 1911. It is presently chartered as a city with a council-manager form of government. Its city manager is nominated by the mayor and elected by the city council. The McCall City Council is made up of 4 council members and a mayor elected in an at-large election. During city council meetings, the mayor presides, and all 5 members can vote on any issue. The mayor has no veto powers.

McCall is located in Idaho's 1st congressional district. On the state level, McCall is located in district 8 of the Idaho Legislature.

Media
McCall is served by two four-color glossy magazines; McCall Magazine and McCall Home, both of which are published semi-annually. McCall is also served by a weekly newspaper The Star News, published on Thursdays, and a third magazine, McCall Life, published quarterly since 2019. Two radio stations, KDZY (98.3 FM Country), and Star 95.5 are based in the town.

Climate
McCall experiences a dry-summer continental climate (Köppen Dsb) with cold, snowy winters and warm, relatively dry summers. The town has slightly less snow cover than the surrounding area, which has snow cover from around November 20 until early April, with 3–4 feet of snow by early February.

Education
McCall-Donnelly School District is the local school district. Students are at Barbara R. Morgan Elementary School, Payette Lakes Middle School, and McCall-Donnelly High School.

Area information
 Ponderosa State Park and the community of McCall hosted the 2008 Masters World Cup.
 The Harshman Skate Park is Idaho's largest. The park was commemorated in August 2006 by Tony Hawk.
 The first annual McCall Ultra Sleddog Challenge race was held in January 2018. The race was developed by nearby resident Jerry Wortley, who had experience as a pilot for the Iditarod dogsled race in Alaska. Wortley wanted to commemorate the area's rich dog mushing tradition. Well-known musher Jessie Royer won the inaugural race.
 The annual Winter Carnival started in the 1960s and brings over 60,000 people to the town during this week-long celebration. The carnival features ice sculptures and live music.

Notable people
 Helen Markley Miller, writer of historical and biographical fiction for children about the Western United States
 Mack Miller, Olympic cross-country skier and trainer
 Barbara Morgan, first teacher in space
 Patty Boydstun-Hovdey - World Cup and Olympic alpine ski racer - U.S. champion - McCall HS class of 1970 
 Torrie Wilson, former WWE Wrestler
 Corey Engen, captain of the US Nordic ski team at the 1948 Winter Olympics in St. Moritz, Switzerland, and co-founder of Brundage Mountain Ski Resort

References

Further reading
 Bowman, Bill C.  The Legacy: The Legacy of Military Records in the History of Valley County, Idaho.
 Brown, Warren Harrington Brown (1999). It's Fun to Remember: A King's Pine Autobiography. 
 Ingraham, Beverly (1992).  Looking Back: Sketches of Early Days in Idaho's High Country. Maverick Publications.
 Rutledge, Sally and Elliott, Craig (2005).  Sylvan Beach: McCall, Idaho. Its History, Myths, and Memories.
 Valley County History Project (2002). Valley County Idaho: Prehistory to 1920. Action Publishing. 
 Williamson, Darcy and Wilcomb, Marlee (2007). McCall's Historic Shore Lodge 1948 - 1989. Meadow Cottage Industries.

External links

 
 McCall Chamber of Commerce
 McCall Star News local newspaper
 McCall-Donnelly Joint School District
 University of Idaho McCall Outdoor Science School

Cities in Idaho
Cities in Valley County, Idaho